The Tertiary Education and Research Network of South Africa (TENET) is the de facto national research and education network in South Africa.

Structure
TENET is a membership-based, non profit company incorporated in South Africa.  Its members are the public universities and statutory research councils it serves.  Its board of directors is appointed by the members at an annual general meeting.

Network
TENET acts as a comprehensive Internet service provider as well as a research and education network: it operates the South African National Research Network (SANReN), a large-scale government infrastructure project that provides network connectivity between higher educational and research organisations.  In addition, it maintains private peering links with a number of large ISPs in South Africa and peers at both the JINX (in Johannesburg) and CINX (in Cape Town) Internet exchange points. International connectivity at 10Gbit/s is provided from points of presence in London and Amsterdam via the SEACOM cable. A second 20Gbit/s route on the WACS cable up the West Coast provides redundant access and was obtained as an IRU by South Africa's Department of Science and Technology as part of the broader aims of SANReN and in support of bandwidth-hungry applications such as the Square Kilometer Array and MeerKAT radio telescope.

Services
TENET operates a growing bundle of services in support of research & education in South Africa. These include:
 Video conferencing
 the eduroam national roaming operator for South Africa
 South African Identity Federation (SAFIRE), which is a member of the global eduGAIN inter-federation.
 a sector CSIRT (in conjunction with SANReN)

Relationships to other research networks
As a founder member of the UbuntuNet Alliance for Research and Education Networking, an African confederation of research and education networks, TENET is committed to improving regional connections.

TENET was connected to GÉANT in October 2004, a relationship that was subsequently subsumed by the UbuntuNet Alliance.

References

External links
 Official homepage
 eduroam South Africa
 South African Identity Federation

Internet in South Africa
National research and education networks
Science and technology in South Africa